Plat is a dispersed settlement in the hills southeast of Mežica in the Carinthia region in northern Slovenia.

The local church is dedicated to Saint Leonard and belongs to the Parish of Mežica. It was built in the second half of the 15th century.

References

External links
Plat on Geopedia

Populated places in the Municipality of Mežica